Third-party and independent members of the United States Congress are generally rare. Although the Republican Party and Democratic Party have dominated U.S. politics in a two-party system since 1856, some independents and members of other political parties have also been elected to Congress or changed their party affiliation to such during their term in office.

Senators

Representatives

References

Lists of members of the United States House of Representatives
Third party (United States)